Province of Santa Cruz de Tenerife, also Province of Santa Cruz, is a province of Spain, consisting of the western part of the autonomous community of the Canary Islands. It consists of about half of the Atlantic archipelago: the islands of Tenerife, La Gomera, El Hierro, and La Palma. It also includes a series of adjacent roques (those of Salmor, Fasnia, Bonanza, Garachico and Anaga).

Its capital is the city of Santa Cruz de Tenerife (commonly known as Santa Cruz), on the island of Tenerife (Spain's most populous island). In 2008 the province had 1,018,510 inhabitants and a density of 313.57 /km2, making it the province of Spain with the sixth highest population density, higher than that of the province of Las Palmas (the eastern half of the Canary Islands). 24% live in the capital. Santa Cruz de Tenerife is the capital of the Autonomous Community of the Canary Islands. There are 54 municipalities in the province; see List of municipalities in Santa Cruz de Tenerife. Tenerife is the most populated island of the Canary Islands and most populous island of Spain. The island of Tenerife has the highest altitude of Spain (Teide 3718 m).

Earlier issued vehicle license plates in this province bear the first two letters "TF" (named after Tenerife). Nowadays the plates share the same numbering system as in mainland Spain.

History 
This province was established in 1927, when the Canarias province (with Santa Cruz de Tenerife as the capital city) was divided into two provinces: Las Palmas and the province of Santa Cruz de Tenerife. In 1982, both provinces became part of the newly founded autonomous community of the Canary Islands.

Population
The historical population is given in the following chart:

National parks 
This province contains three of Spain's national parks, more than any other province: the Caldera de Taburiente National Park on La Palma, the Garajonay National Park on La Gomera, and the Teide National Park on Tenerife, encompassing Teide, Spain's highest mountain and also an inactive volcano.

Main sights (Tenerife) 

Mount Teide: is a volcano on Tenerife in the Canary Islands. Its -high summit is the highest point in Spain, the highest point above sea level in the islands of the Atlantic, and it is the third highest volcano in the world measured from its base on the ocean floor, after Mauna Loa and Mauna Kea located in Hawaii. The volcano and its surroundings comprise the Teide National Park, is also one of the most visited National Parks in the world, with a total of 2.8 million visitors, according to the Instituto Canario de Estadística (ISTAC).
Auditorio de Tenerife: Was designed by architect Santiago Calatrava Valls, construction began in 1997 and was completed in 2003. The auditorium was inaugurated on 26 September of that year with the presence of Felipe de Borbón, Prince of Asturias, and was later visited by former U.S. President Bill Clinton. The building is framed within the tenets of late-modern architecture of the late 20th century. The majestic profile of the auditorium has become an architectural symbol of the city of Santa Cruz de Tenerife. It is also regarded as the finest modern building in the Canary Islands and one of the most emblematic buildings of Spanish architecture.
The Basilica of Our Lady of Candelaria (in Candelaria): The place where the image of the Virgin of Candelaria (saint patron of the Canary Islands) can be found, this sanctuary is built in neoclassical style, and is visited daily by the parishioners, who visit the Villa Mariana out of devotion to the Virgin. Is the first Marian shrine of the Canary Islands, the principal catholic center of peregrination of the Canary Islands and one of the principal ones of Spain, the basilica hosts more than 2,5 million visitors annually.
San Cristóbal de La Laguna: Is third-most populous city of the archipelago and second-most populous city of the island. Its economy is business-oriented while agriculture dominates the northeastern portion of the city. The urban area dominates the central and the southern parts. Tourism covers the northern coast. The main industry includes some manufacturing. La Laguna historical center was declared World Heritage Site by the UNESCO in 1999. In 2010 after a survey, La Laguna was listed as the city with the best reputation in the Canary Islands and the third no provincial capital city of Spain with the best reputation, but behind Gijon and Marbella.
Museo de la Naturaleza y el Hombre: Is a museum based in Santa Cruz de Tenerife, it contains many significant archaeological finds and is considered the best repository of objects from the Prehispanic Canary Islands. The museum also houses significant paleontological, botanical, entomological and marine and terrestrial vertebrate collections, in an excellent state of preservation, and is considered the best Natural Library of the Canary Islands. The museum also integrates the Archaeological Museum of Tenerife, the Bioantropología's Canary Institute and the Museum of Natural Sciences of Tenerife. The museum is located in the downtown area of Santa Cruz, in the former Civil Hospital, a building that constitutes an example of the neoclassical architecture of Canary Islands. The archaeological section was founded in 1958. The museum holds the largest collection on the culture of the Guanche and also has one of the most modern methods of presentation of mummies, (announced in 2006 by the Cabildo de Tenerife through a communique). It is also an internationally renowned museum and has participated in international meetings on archeology, but its fame is mainly due to its formidable collection of Guanche mummies.
Los Cristianos: Is a town situated on the south coast of Tenerife. Located in the municipality of Arona between the cone of the mountain Chayofita and the greater mountain Guaza. The town centre is around the Los Cristianos bay, but is rapidly expanding inland with modern development. The town is a popular tourist resort and includes a ferry port.
The Cathedral of San Cristóbal de La Laguna: Is a Catholic cathedral in Tenerife, Spain. Begun in 1904 and completed in 1915, it is dedicated to the Virgin of Los Remedios. This is one of the most important temples of the Canary Islands. Located in the city of San Cristóbal de La Laguna.
Puerto de la Cruz: Is a city and municipality located on the north coast of Tenerife, in the Orotava Valley. Prior to the development of hotels and buildings, much of the area consisted of agricultural land. Considerable fiscal pressure led to the land being developed and the population shifted from rural to urban and tourism. The population is mainly urban today.

Largest cities 

 Santa Cruz de Tenerife (Tenerife): 221,956 inhabitants
 San Cristóbal de La Laguna (Tenerife): 148,375 inhabitants
 Arona (Tenerife): 75,903 inhabitants
 Adeje (Tenerife): 41,002 inhabitants
 La Orotava (Tenerife): 40,945 inhabitants
 Granadilla de Abona (Tenerife): 38,866 inhabitants
 Los Realejos (Tenerife): 37,575 inhabitants
 Puerto de la Cruz (Tenerife): 31,804 inhabitants
 Los Llanos de Aridane (La Palma): 20,170 inhabitants
 Santa Cruz de La Palma (La Palma): 17,132 inhabitants
 San Sebastián de La Gomera (La Gomera): 8744 inhabitants
 Valverde (El Hierro): 4938 inhabitants

References 

 
1927 establishments in Spain
States and territories established in 1927